The A. G. Becker Property is a historic estate at 405 Sheridan Road in Highland Park, Illinois. The estate was built in 1921 for businessman A. G. Becker. Architect Howard Van Doren Shaw designed the estate's brick Tudor Revival house, which has been modified significantly since its construction. Landscape architect Jens Jensen designed the estate's grounds, which include typical elements of Jensen's such as native plants and decorative rockwork. The grounds also include one of the few surviving Jensen-designed meadows, a once-common feature of his work that was often lost to land divisions and development.

The estate was added to the National Register of Historic Places on November 15, 1984.

References

National Register of Historic Places in Lake County, Illinois
Houses on the National Register of Historic Places in Illinois
Tudor Revival architecture in Illinois
Houses completed in 1921
Highland Park, Illinois